"Hallå hela pressen" is a song written by Mia Kempff, Ackie Kempff and Strix Q, and performed by Chattanooga at Melodifestivalen 1982, ending up 4th.

At the Swedish singles chart the song peaked at second position in Sweden, and fourth position in Norway.

The song charted at Svensktoppen for eight weeks between 28 March-16 May 1982, topping the chart during the first week.

A 2004 recording by Nina & Kim together with Chattanooga peaked at 7th position at the Swedish singles chart.

The 1982 Chattanooga single is one of the titles in the book Tusen svenska klassiker (2009).

Charts

Chattanooga version

Nina & Kim with Chattanooga version

References

External links
 Information at Svensk mediedatabas

1982 songs
1982 singles
Melodifestivalen songs of 1982
Songs about the media
Swedish-language songs